Zamość Voivodeship was a unit of administrative division and local government in Poland in years 1975–1998, superseded by Lublin Voivodeship.

Capital city: Zamość

Major cities and towns (population in 1995):

 Zamość (66,300)
 Biłgoraj (26,400)
 Tomaszów Lubelski (21,200)
 Hrubieszów (20,200)

See also

 Voivodeships of Poland

Former voivodeships of Poland (1975–1998)
History of Lublin Voivodeship